Ronny Hovland, better known as Ares, (born 3 June 1973 in Bergen) is a Norwegian metal vocalist, guitarist and bassist, and the founder of the Norwegian death metal band Aeternus.

Biography
Ares is the founder of the Norwegian dark metal/death metal band Aeternus, in which he plays guitar and does the vocals. The band was formed in 1993 as a trio, composed of Ares, Erik Vrolok, and Morrigan. From 1995 to 1997, Ares was the bassist of the black metal band Gorgoroth, before Aeternus' debut album, Beyond the Wandering Moon, was released in 1997 on Hammerheart Records. Aeternus has since toured with bands such as Emperor and Deicide, and has released an additional five full-length albums. Ares is now the only remaining original member of Aeternus. In addition to Aeternus and Gorgoroth, Ares has played in several other extreme metal bands, and has done live work for bands such as Immortal and Grimfist.

Associated bands
Current
Aeternus - since 1993

Former
Gorgoroth - 1995-1997
Corona Borealis
Black Hole Generator - (guest appearance on Black Karma EP + live in 2007)
Immortal - 1998 (live)
Grimfist - (live)
Malignant Eternal - (live)
Chaos Predicted - 
Dark Fortress - 2003 (guest vocalist)
Orth (1996–1997)
Gravdal (session live bass 2010)

Discography

Aeternus
Walk My Path (demo) (1994)
Dark Sorcery (EP) (1995)
Beyond the Wandering Moon (1997)
...And So the Night Became (1998)
Dark Rage (7") (1998)
Shadows of Old (2000)
Burning the Shroud (EP) (2001)
Ascension of Terror (2001)
A Darker Monument (2003)
Hexaeon (2006)

Gorgoroth
The Last Tormentor (live EP) (1996)
Under the Sign of Hell (1997)
Destroyer (1998)
Bergen 1996 (EP) (2007)

Black Hole Generator
Black Karma (EP) (2006)

Dark Fortess
Profane Genocidal Creations (2003)

Corona Borealis
Cantus Paganus (2000)

References

External links
Aeternus official MySpace profile

1973 births
Living people
Musicians from Bergen
Norwegian black metal musicians
Norwegian male singers
Norwegian rock singers
Norwegian multi-instrumentalists
English-language singers from Norway
Immortal (band) members
Gorgoroth members